Nigel Holmes (born 15 June 1942, Swanland, England) is a British/American graphic designer, author, and theorist, who focuses on information graphics and information design.

Biography 
Graduating from Royal College of Art in London in 1966, Holmes ran his own successful graphic design practice in England. From 1966 to 1977 he worked as a freelance illustrator and graphic designer for clients such as British Broadcasting Corporation, Ford Motor Company, and Island Records. His work appeared in New Scientist, Radio Times, The Observer, Daily Telegraph, and The Times.

In 1977, art director Walter Bernard hired him to work in the map and chart department of Time magazine, where Holmes later became graphics director.

After a sabbatical he started his own company, which has explained things to and for a wide variety of clients, including Apple, Fortune, Nike, The Smithsonian Institution, Sony, United Healthcare, US Airways, and Visa.

In 2011 Stevenson University held a retrospective show of his work titled Picture This - The Explanation Design of Nigel Holmes.

In 2016 an exhibition of his work from 1960 to 2015 was shown at the QVIG Conference in Munich, Germany, and also at the VisCom Gallery, Schoonover Center, Ohio University

Publications 
Partial list.

Books authored by Nigel Holmes
 Designer's Guide to Creating Charts and Diagrams (1984 Watson-Guptill) 
 Designing Pictorial Symbols (1985 Watson-Guptill with Rose DeNeve) 
 Pictorial Maps (1991 Watson-Guptill) 
 Best in Diagrammatic Graphics (1993 Rotovision) 
 Wordless Diagrams (2005 Bloomsbury) 
 Pinhole and the Expedition to the Jungle (2010 Jorge Pinto Books) 
 The Book of Everything: A Visual Guide to Travel and the World (2012 Lonely Planet) 
 Instant Expert: A Visual Guide to the Skills You've Always Wanted (2014 Lonely Planet) 
 Crazy Competitions (2018 Taschen edited by Julius Wiedemann) 
 The Bigger Book of Everything: A Visual Guide to Travel and the World (2020 Lonely Planet) 
 Joyful Infographics: A Friendly, Human Approach to Data (2022 CRC Press)

Books with graphics by Nigel Holmes
 The Holy War, June 67 (1967 Cornmarket Press, edited by Christopher Angeloglou and Brian Haynes)
 English Landscapes (1973 BBC by W.G. Hoskins)
 The Making of the English (1973 BBC by Barry Cunliffe)
 Focus on Health (1973 Nelson Ann Burkitt)
 The Ascent of Man (1973 Little, Brown and Company, by Jacob Bronowski)
 Understanding USA (2000 TED Conference by Richard Saul Wurman)
 Information Anxiety 2 (2001 Que by Richard Saul Wurman)
 Diagnostic Tests for Men (2001 Top Books by Richard Saul Wurman)
 Understanding Children (2002 Top Books by Richard Saul Wurman)
 Understanding Healthcare (2004 Top Books by Richard Saul Wurman)
 The Enlightened Bracketologist: The Final Four of Everything (2007 Bloomsbury, by Mark Reiter, and Richard Sandomir)
 Blue Planet Run: The Race to Provide Safe Drinking Water to the World. (2007 Earth Aware Editions, by Rick Smolan, Jennifer Erwitt, and a foreword by Robert Redford)
 The Obama Time Capsule (2009 Against All Odds Productions, by Rick Smolan, Jennifer Erwitt, and Phoebe Smolan)
 Presimetrics: What the Facts Tell Us About How the Presidents Measure Up On the Issues We Care About (2010 Black Dog & Leventhal by Mike Kimel and Michael Kanell)
 Graphic: Inside the Sketchbooks of the World’s Great Graphic Designers  (2010 The Monacelli Press by Steven Heller and Lita Talarico)
 Gerd Arntz: Graphic Designer (2010 010 Publishers edited by Ed Annink and Max Bruinsma)
 The Human Face of Big Data (2012 Against All Odds Productions, by Rick Smolan, and Jennifer Erwitt)
 Information Graphics (2012 Taschen, by Sandra Rendgen)
 Raw Data: Infographic Designers' Sketchbooks (2014 Thames & Hudson Ltd by Steven Heller and Rick Landers)
 Understanding the World. The Atlas of Infographics (2014 Taschen, by Sandra Rendgen)
 The Good Fight (2017 Against All Odds Productions, by Rick Smolan, and Jennifer Erwitt)

About Nigel Holmes
 On Information Design (2006 Jorge Pinto Books by Steven Heller)

Lectures and teaching
Partial list

 1980-2009 The Stanford Professional Publishing Course. Developed live action charts on stage, with students taking part.
 1984-1993 Rhode Island School of Design. An annual weeklong workshop for practicing information graphics designers, conducted with Dave Gray, Robert Lockwood, Ed Miller, George Rorick, John Monahon and guest lecturers.
 1990 TED 2
 1999 TED 9
 2000 TED 10 
 2009 TED (25th anniversary)
 2011-2018 Yale Publishing Course (the successor to The Stanford Professional Publishing Course)

References

External links
 Nigel Holmes homepage
 AIGA Essay
 Eye Magazine interview

1942 births
Alumni of the Royal College of Art
British graphic designers
British illustrators
Information graphic designers
Living people
Information visualization experts